St. Charles Apartments is a historic apartment building in Lincoln, Nebraska. It was built in 1923-1924 by William Henry Seng, and designed in the Classical Revival style. Seng owned the building until 1938, and he died in 1958. It has been listed on the National Register of Historic Places since September 12, 1985.

References

	
National Register of Historic Places in Lincoln, Nebraska
Neoclassical architecture in Nebraska
Residential buildings completed in 1923
1923 establishments in Nebraska